Effiong Okon Eyo (1918 - 1983) was a Nigerian politician who was a former deputy speaker of the House of Assembly, Eastern region of Nigeria. Eyo was originally a member of NCNC but after a fallout with party leader, Azikiwe, he joined the opposition. Thereafter, he was involved in a petition to probe of the affairs of African Continental Bank and the bank's relationship with the regional government in 1956.

Life
Eyo, popularly known as Eyo Uyo, was born in Ibesikpo area of Uyo. He attended Government College Umuahia; after stepping out of Umuahia, he then took on various duties including working as a school teacher, trader and clerk. In 1949, he organized a scholarship program funded by the Ibesikpo community. The scholarship was planned to send 100 students from the community to secondary school and four students in tertiary institutions, it was funded by the April palm produce of community members. When representative democracy began in 1951, Eyo won the election to represent Uyo at the Eastern regional House of Assembly, following his victory and through an electoral college system, he was selected as a member of the House of Representatives between 1953 and 1954. In 1953, there was a crisis in the House of Assembly which led to the resignation of the premier, Eyo Ita and call for new mandates. Nnamdi Azikiwe, the leader of opposition in the Western region, moved to the east where he contested and won election in Onitsha, his hometown. Azikiwe became the new premier with support of legislators including Eyo who was appointed Chief Whip and chairman of the Eastern Region Development Company. Towards the end of 1956, Eyo and Azikiwe had a fallout, Eyo then petitioned the colonial government to probe the role of the premier in the affairs of a private bank. When a fresh election was called, Eyo joined the Action Group and was elected, he was now as a member of the opposition with a primary focus on the creation of a Calabar, Ogoja and Rivers (COR) State.

When a Southeastern State was created, Eyo was a commissioner under the military administration of Esuene. In 1977, he was a councilor representing Uyo and later joined Great Nigeria People's Party during the Second Nigerian Republic. He was the second president of the Ibibio Union, after Ekong Etuk

References

1918 births
1983 deaths
People from Uyo
Nigerian politicians
Government College Umuahia alumni
Niger Delta Business Guide, April-May, 2021, ISSN:2782-7518